Roman Hovavko (born 2 March 1988) is a Belarusian former footballer.

Honours
Dinamo Brest
Belarusian Cup winner: 2006–07

External links
 
 
 Profile at teams.by

1988 births
Living people
Sportspeople from Brest, Belarus
Belarusian footballers
Association football midfielders
FC Dynamo Brest players
FC Granit Mikashevichi players
FC Baranovichi players
FC Slonim-2017 players